Taneisha Tennant (born June 15, 1989) is a female American mixed martial artist, currently competing in the bantamweight division of Invicta FC, where she is the former Invicta FC Bantamweight Champion.

Background
Tennant was in nursing school when she was diagnosed with Hodgkin’s Lymphoma, after which she spent the next year having chemotherapy and radiation therapy. Right after that, Hurricane Sandy hit the New York area, and Tennant's house was flooded to the upper level, losing many of her possessions, photos, and videos. Tennant is currently a full-time nurse charged with the health and safety of her local retirement community.

Mixed martial arts career

Invicta FC
In her MMA debut at Ring Of Combat 68, she faced Despina Karavas and went on to knock her out in the first round. Tennant made her Invicta FC debut against Serena DeJesus at Invicta FC 38: Murata vs. Ducote on November 1, 2019. Murata won the fight by split decision, with two judges scoring the bout 48-47 and 49-46 in her favor. She won the bout via unanimous decision.

Tennant participated in the Invicta Bantamweight Tournament for the next title shot at the Invicta FC Bantamweight Championship at Invicta FC Phoenix Series 3 on March 6, 2020. She defeated Brittney Victoria via unanimous decision in the quarterfinals, followed by Hope Chase via unanimous decision in the semifinals. In the finals, Tennant defeated Taylor Guardado via unanimous decision.

Tennant moved up to Featherweight and faced Danyelle Wolf at Dana White's Contender Series 33 on September 15. She lost the fight via unanimous decision.

Invicta FC Bantamweight champion
Tennant faced Lisa Verzosa for the vacant Invicta FC Bantamweight Championship at Invicta FC 44: A New Era on August 27, 2021. Tennant won the one sided bout via unanimous decision, becoming the new Invicta Bantamweight Champion

Tennant made her first Invicta FC Bantamweight title defense against the one-time Bellator MMA featherweight title challenger Olga Rubin at Invicta FC 48: Tennant vs. Rubin on July 20, 2022. She retained her title by split decision, with scores of 47–48, 48–47 and 50–45.

Tennant made her second Invicta FC Bantamweight title defense against the four-fight UFC veteran Talita Bernardo at Invicta FC 51 on January 18, 2023. She lost the fight by unanimous decision, with all three judges scoring the bout 48–46 for Bernardo.

Professional grappling career

Tennant was invited to compete a 135lbs grappling tournament at Rise Invitational 11 on April 1, 2023.

Championships and accomplishments 

 Invicta Fighting Championships
 Invicta FC Bantamweight Championship (One time, former)
 One successful title defense

Mixed martial arts record

|-
|Loss
|align=center| 5–2
|Talita Bernardo
|Decision (unanimous)
|Invicta FC 51
|
|align=center|5
|align=center|5:00
|Denver, Colorado, United States
|
|-
|Win
|align=center| 5–1
|Olga Rubin
|Decision (split)
|Invicta FC 48
|
|align=center|5
|align=center|5:00
|Denver, Colorado, United States
|
|-
|Win
|align=center| 4–1
|Lisa Verzosa
|Decision (unanimous)
|Invicta FC 44: A New Era
|
|align=center|5
|align=center|5:00
|Kansas City, Kansas, United States
|
|-
|Loss
|align=center| 3–1
|Danyelle Wolf
|Decision (unanimous)
|Dana White's Contender Series 33
|
|align=center|3
|align=center|5:00
|Las Vegas, Nevada, United States
|
|-
|Win
|align=center| 3–0
|Taylor Guardado
| Decision (unanimous)
| Invicta FC Phoenix Series 3 
|  
|align=center|3
|align=center|5:00
| Kansas City, Kansas, United States
|
|-
|Win
|align=center| 2–0
|Serena DeJesus
|Decision (unanimous)
| Invicta FC 38: Murata vs. Ducote
|  
|align=center|3
|align=center|5:00
| Kansas City, Kansas, United States
|
|-
|Win
|align=center| 1–0
|Despina Karavas
|KO (body kick)
|Ring of Combat 68
|
|align=center|1
|align=center|2:02
|Atlantic City, New Jersey, United States
|
|-
|}

Mixed martial arts exhibition record

|-
| Win
| align=center| 2–0
| Hope Chase
| Decision (unanimous)
| Invicta FC Phoenix Series 3 
|  
|align=center|1
|align=center|5:00
| Kansas City, Kansas, United States
|
|-
| Win
| align=center| 1–0
| Brittney Victoria
| Decision (unanimous)
| Invicta FC Phoenix Series 3 
|  
|align=center|1
|align=center|5:00
| Kansas City, Kansas, United States
|
|-

See also
 List of female mixed martial artists
 List of current mixed martial arts champions
 List of current Invicta FC fighters

References

External links
 Taneisha Tennant at Invicta FC
 

1980 births
People from New York City
Living people
American female mixed martial artists
Bantamweight mixed martial artists
21st-century American women